Richard Lerman (Dec 5, 1944 in San Francisco, CA) is a composer and sound artist whose, "work...centers around his custom-made contact microphones of unusually small size," including, "piezo disks and other transducers". He studied with Alvin Lucier, Gordon Mumma, and David Tudor.

He was awarded a Guggenheim Fellowship in Sound Art (Video & Audio) for 1987-88. He also works in film, having had a show at MOMA, and is currently working on advanced programming in DVD creation.

Lerman's work is often site-specific. Pieces include Travelon Gamelon, for amplified bicycles; A Seasonal Mapping of the Sonoran Desert, which includes cactus needles plucked by rainfall; and the collaboration (with Mona Higuchi) Threading History, for which he recorded prison camp barbed wire. In the 80s he lived in Boston and taught at the Museum School and the Center for Advanced Visual Studies at MIT.

Sources

External links
"Richard Lerman's Site", West.ASU.edu.

1944 births
American male composers
21st-century American composers
Living people
21st-century American male musicians